St. Stephen's School may refer to one of the following schools or colleges:

K-12 schools
Australia
St Stephens School, Brisbane
St Stephen's School, Perth

United States
St. Stephen's & St. Agnes School, Alexandria, Virginia
St. Stephen's Armenian Elementary School, Watertown, Massachusetts
St. Stephen's Episcopal School (Austin, Texas)
St. Stephen's Episcopal School (Bradenton, Florida)
St. Stephen's Catholic School (Framingham, Massachusetts)
St. Stephen's Episcopal School (Houston, Texas)

India
St. Stephen's School, Chandigarh
 St.Stephen's School, Habra
 St. Stephen's School, Thakurnagar

Primary schools 
Saint Stephen's School, Singapore
St Stephen's Infant School, Canterbury
St Stephen's Junior School, Canterbury
St Stephen's Primary School, Tonbridge
St. Stephen's School, Twickenham
St Stephen's School (Shepherd's Bush)
St. Stephen's Elementary School, Halifax, Nova Scotia, Canada

Secondary schools 
St. Stephen's Episcopal School (Austin, Texas)
St. Stephen's High School, Manila, Philippines
St. Stephens High School, Hickory, North Carolina
St. Stephen's School, Chandigarh
St. Stephen's School Rome
St. Stephen's Girls' College, Hong Kong
St. Stephen's College, Hong Kong

Tertiary schools
St. Stephen's College, Delhi, India

See also
St. Stephen's College (disambiguation)
Stephens High School (disambiguation)